Wellington's Column, or the Waterloo Memorial, is a monument to the Duke of Wellington standing on the corner of William Brown Street and Lime Street, Liverpool, Merseyside, England.  It is recorded in the National Heritage List for England as a designated Grade II* listed building.

History
After the Duke's death in 1852, in common with other cities, Liverpool decided to erect a monument to celebrate his achievements. A committee was established to organise public subscriptions, but the money was slow to come in.  A competition was set up in 1856 to find a designer for the column, and this was won by the architect Andrew Lawson of Edinburgh. There were further delays while a suitable site was found, with sites at the top of Duke Street and Bold Street, in front of the Adelphi Hotel and Prince's Park being considered before the eventual location was settled on. In 1861 a second competition, this time for the statue of the Duke, was won by George Anderson Lawson, brother of the column's designer. The design of the column and plinth closely resembles that of the Melville Monument commemorating Henry Dundas, Lord Melville in St Andrew Square, Edinburgh, itself loosely modelled on Trajan's Column in Rome.

The foundation stone was laid on 1 May 1861 by the Mayor of Liverpool. There were further delays during construction of the monument due to subsidence. Although it was inaugurated on 16 May 1863 in a ceremony attended by the Mayor and Sir William Brown, it was still not complete. Reliefs depicting Wellington's victories and the charge at the Battle of Waterloo were still to be added and it was finally completed towards the end of 1865. These delays resulted in its being "a very late example of a column-monument for Britain".

Description
The foundations of the monument are in Runcorn sandstone, the pedestal is in granite, and the column itself is in Darley Dale sandstone. It stands on a stepped base with a square pedestal. On each side of the pedestal is a bronze plaque; at the corners are bronze eagles joined by swags along the sides. Standing on the pedestal is a Roman Doric fluted column. Within the column are 169 steps leading up to a viewing platform. On top of the column is a cylinder surmounted by a cupola on which the bronze statue of the Duke stands. The statue is made from the melted-down bronze from cannons captured at the Battle of Waterloo. The Duke holds a scroll in his right hand, and his left hand rests on the hilt of his sword.

The brass plaque on the south of the pedestal is a relief depicting the final charge at the battle of Waterloo. On the east and west faces, the plaques bear the names of the Duke's victorious battles. The east panel lists the battles of Assaye, Talavera, Argaum, Busaco, Roliça, Fuentes de Oñoro, Vimeiro, Ciudad Rodrigo, Oporto, and Badajoz; the west panel Salamanca, Bayonne, Vittoria, Orthez, San Sebastián, Toulouse, Nivelle, Quatre Bras, and Waterloo. Also on and around the base of the monument are pre-metric standard Board of Trade measurements of length, the shorter ones being embossed on a bronze panel.

See also
 Grade II* listed buildings in Liverpool – City Centre

References

Columns related to the Napoleonic Wars
Grade II* listed buildings in Liverpool
Outdoor sculptures in England
Monumental columns in England
Monuments and memorials in Liverpool
Liverpool
Buildings and structures completed in 1865
1865 sculptures
Bronze sculptures in the United Kingdom
Statues in England
Grade II* listed monuments and memorials
Observation towers in the United Kingdom